Annitsford is a village located in North Tyneside, on the border between Tyne and Wear and Northumberland.
The main conurbation of the village falls under the jurisdiction of the Borough of North Tyneside in Tyne and Wear.

History 
The name of the village is the modern-day version of Annet's Ford, which was a crossing place over the Seaton Burn which flows eastward through the village. Annitsford borders the villages of Dudley and Fordley, the former taking its name from the son of the mine owner, the latter taking its name from the last part of the village names for Annitsford and Dudley.

There is one public house in the village, The Bridge (formerly The Bridge Inn) and it is over 140 years old.  It is shown on maps of the village dated 1864, together with the Annitsford Brewery (Annetsford Brewery).  This was resited further along the village in later years, and which in later life was a soft drink factory (Dickmans), turning into a transport café circa early 1970s.  The premises is now shared by an Indian takeaway (Annitsford Tandoori) and a Fish & Chip shop (K&L Fisheries). The Bridge Inn was for many years in the custodianship of the Swinhoe family, culminating in its massive popularity as a Steak House with a reputation regionwide, throughout the seventies and eighties until the retirement of Gladys & Bill Swinhoe.  The fortunes of the pub have not hit those heights since. There are two (CIU) Working Men's Social Clubs in the village, The Pioneer & the United Irish League (The Ranch).

Religion 
The village school, Annitsford First School was closed and demolished, eventually making way for a housing development. The same fate fell a number of years earlier to the village's Catholic school and chapel (Annitsford RC Primary), which was built in 1871.  The village has a history of strong Irish Catholic links formed by the immigrant workers who came over in the late 19th century to find work in the nearby mines of Dudley and Weetslade.

The Annitsford Roman Catholic Church, St John The Baptist RC Church still stands on the northern edge of the village, but with boundary and road changes, the modern-day person would regard this as being part of the southern edge of Cramlington. In the grounds of the church is buried one of Annitsford's most famous sons, the world-renowned opera singer Owen Brannigan. Descendants of Brannigan's family still live in the village and a street is named after him, in nearby Fordley, Owen Brannigan Drive. Not to be outdone, the Methodists also had their own smaller chapel which stood at the entrance to the Annitsford Welfare, home for many years to Annitsford Football Club. There is now a local football team called "New Fordley Juniors".

Expansion 
Annitsford was a small village until it grew considerably circa 1969 when the old terraced streets of Jubilee Terrace, Jackson Street and Lee Street were demolished, and the residents moved into new local authority built houses comprising Wardle Drive, Annitsford Drive and Hudson Avenue.  In doing so the natural green field boundary keeping Annitsford and Fordley apart disappeared.  More housing was built on the land formerly occupied by the terraces and was called Harrison Court, together with the sheltered accommodation development of Jubilee Court. Further housing developments have been built on the west edge of the village (The Wyndings) and the east edge (The Spinney), increasing the overall size of the village considerably.

The village is known locally as "The Ford".

External links

Map Of Annitsford in 1864

Villages in Tyne and Wear
Villages in Northumberland